The Pontiac Silverdome (also known simply as the Silverdome) was a stadium in Pontiac, Michigan. It opened in 1975 and sat on 199 acres (51 ha) of land. When the stadium opened, it featured a fiberglass fabric roof held up by air pressure, the first use of the architectural technique in a major athletic facility. With a seating capacity of 82,666+, it was the largest stadium in the National Football League (NFL) until FedExField in Landover, Maryland, a suburb of Washington, D.C. expanded its capacity to over 85,000 in 2000.

It was primarily the home of the Detroit Lions of the NFL from 1975 to 2001 and was also home to the Detroit Pistons of the National Basketball Association (NBA) from 1978 to 1988. In addition, the Silverdome also served as the home venue for the Detroit Express of the North American Soccer League and the Michigan Panthers of the United States Football League, as well as two college bowl games: the Cherry Bowl and the Motor City Bowl. In 2012, the Silverdome served as the home venue of the Detroit Mechanix of the American Ultimate Disc League and hosted the league championship game that season.

The stadium was a regular concert venue and hosted a number of athletic and non-athletic events, including the 1979 NBA All-Star Game, Super Bowl XVI, WrestleMania III, early round games of the 1994 FIFA World Cup, and regional games in the NCAA Division I men's basketball tournament.

After the opening of Ford Field in 2002, the stadium was left without a permanent tenant. The city of Pontiac was unable to find a good use for the stadium, leaving it empty for 8 years; the city ran out of money, and was forced to sell due to the rising maintenance costs. After multiple attempts to solicit redevelopment plans, the city eventually sold the stadium at auction in 2009 with no reserve for $550,000 (less than 1% of the cost to build the dome) to a Canadian real estate developer. The property had fallen into disrepair brought on by the city's financial crises, and The City of Pontiac's inability to afford to spend the necessary capital investments it required. After a significant financial investment by the new owners, the facility was brought back to its original glory. The millions of dollars invested by the new owners were needed to bring The Silverdome back to a safe and clean facility. The Pontiac Silverdome reopened in 2010 and hosted many events, including soccer matches, concerts, HBO championship boxing, monster truck shows and many more. The harsh Michigan weather eventually got the best of the aging venue, and in 2013 an excessive amount of snow caused a portion of the antiquated roof system to tear. The Pontiac Silverdome's roof issues dated back to the 1980s with a long list of weather related problems. The Pontiac Silverdome's uniqueness was also its downfall. As one of the last air supported football stadiums left, the inability to find a qualified company capable enough to repair the damaged roof, paired with the financial woes of the city, and the city's inability to pay for police, emergency services and road maintenance, the decision to close the facility for good was decided in 2013. The owners later auctioned the stadium's contents in 2014 and for a few years the parking lot was home to tens of thousands of recalled Volkswagen vehicles.

In 2017, the Silverdome owner decided to tear down the closed facility. The upper ring of the stadium, which had supported the roof structure, was imploded on December 4, 2017, after a failed attempt the previous day. Following the implosion, the remains of the stadium were brought down in sections with hydraulic excavators, and the last free standing section was felled by late March 2018. In September 2019, it was announced that Amazon would develop the site.

Former uses
The Silverdome hosted the Detroit Lions of the NFL (1975–2001), the Detroit Pistons of the NBA (1978–1988), the Detroit Express (for both outdoor and indoor soccer) of the NASL (1978–1980), the Michigan Panthers of the USFL (1983–1984), college football's Cherry Bowl (1984–1985), the Motor City Bowl (1997–2001), the MHSAA football state finals (1976–2004) and four first-round games during soccer's 1994 FIFA World Cup.

For the World Cup matches, a natural grass surface capable of growing inside the dome was developed and installed by a team from Michigan State University. This grass surface was laid upon wooden pallets atop the artificial turf that was usually used. It was the first time that World Cup games were played indoors. The Silverdome also hosted the 1979 NBA All-Star Game, Super Bowl XVI on January 24, 1982, and the 1988 and 1991 NCAA Division I men's basketball tournament Midwest Regionals and NCAA Men's Division I Indoor Track and Field Championships in 1982 and 1983.

On March 29, 1987, the World Wrestling Federation's WrestleMania III reportedly established the record for attendance of 93,173, the largest recorded attendance for a live indoor sporting event in North America. The record stood until February 14, 2010, when the 2010 NBA All-Star Game broke the indoor sporting event record with an attendance of 108,713 at Cowboys Stadium.

The Silverdome hosted an AMA Supercross Championship round from 1976 to 2005.

In 2012, the Silverdome became the home stadium of the city's professional Ultimate Frisbee team, the Detroit Mechanix, of the American Ultimate Disc League. That year, the Silverdome hosted the AUDL championship game, as on August 11, the Philadelphia Spinners defeated the Indianapolis AlleyCats 29–22.

After the roof had been collapsed and the stadium abandoned, Red Bull produced a video of BMX rider Tyler Fernengel riding inside the Silverdome in 2015. Some notable tricks in the video were Fernengel's barspin to double peg to 180° spin on one of the handrails inside the stadium and an impressive "truckdriver" (handlebars spinning 360° while the bike frame spins 360°) out of the luxury boxes onto a ramp that led down to the field. That same year, a drag racing event at the former parking lot marked the beginning of Woodward Dream Cruise.

History

Conception/development
The idea of a major sports complex was part of a dream of C. Don Davidson, a Pontiac native and star high school athlete. Davidson, upon graduating from Pontiac Central High School in 1947 and completing active duty with the U.S. Marine Corps, attended North Carolina State University on a football scholarship. After earning a master's degree in urban planning and architecture, Davidson began his career as an architect and was recognized for several government and city projects throughout the south including Florida's Jacksonville International Airport. He returned to Pontiac in 1965 and was shocked to see the deterioration of the city and its lack of a future plan. Davidson embarked upon what would eventually become an obsession for him to see his beloved city succeed. In 1965–66, he was hired as a professor of architecture and urban planning at the University of Detroit under the direction of Bruno Leon.

As part of an ongoing, comprehensive study by his architecture class on urban renewal for the city of Pontiac, Davidson met with various city and state authorities including William Clay Ford, owner of the Detroit Lions, to discuss the possibility of a new stadium, made it a college class project to find a suitable site for a new stadium and even started his own weekly newspaper known as The Pontiac Times, to help promote his vision. After much controversy and sparring with Detroit city officials, Pontiac was chosen over several other sites including the Michigan Fairgrounds, Walled Lake and the Detroit Riverfront as the best place for construction of what would become known as the Pontiac Silverdome. Already having a stadium concept as part of his master plan for the city, Davidson was interviewed and ultimately hired as chief project designer for the stadium project by the architectural firm of O'Dell, Hewlett & Luckenbach. Initial designs included a dual stadium complex for both football and baseball (potentially housing the Detroit Tigers) that was later scrapped due to high costs. Davidson was pleased to see a part of his vision for the city of Pontiac accomplished in the building of the 80,000-seat sports complex.  Completed in 1975 as the Pontiac Metropolitan Stadium, at a cost of $55.7 million, the Silverdome seated 80,311. It contained 102 luxury suites and 7,384 club seats. It sometimes incorporated the arrowhead emblem from its namesake General Motors division into its own logo.

Original silver-like roof
The original silver-like roof was built of Teflon-coated fiberglass panels, and supported by air pressure inside the stadium. Although the roof has always been white in color as viewed with the naked eye, the stadium obtained the name "Silverdome" (which it would officially take on in 1977) due to a silver-like reflection caused by the Sun, mainly noticed from the sky. (Initially, however, the stadium also went by its shortened nickname of PonMet, but that nickname was disliked by Pontiac city commissioners.) The roof was replaced by a new canvas fabric, reinforced by steel girders after a strong snowstorm on March 4, 1985, caused structural damage to the old roof. Because of the damage, the Detroit Pistons played the remainder of the 1984–85 season at the now-closed Joe Louis Arena.

The 1985 repairs were necessitated by a collapse of the original 1975 roof around noon EST on March 4, 1985. Heavy, wet snow accumulated on the southwest corner of the dome and depressed the fabric panels low enough so that the fabric came in contact with a steel lighting catwalk that was positioned just below the inner lip of the roof's ring beam. The hole caused a loss of air pressure and the Dome deflated slowly – there were no injuries. The shift from a "dome" to "bowl" caused all the heavy, wet snow to slide down into the bowl and rupture more roof panels, collapse some precast risers in the SW upper deck, and dislodge more plastic seats "... than a Rolling Stones concert" according to Bob Haney, the Dome's Operations Manager. Crews from Owens-Corning Fiberglas, the dome's original roof installer, were on site by 1:30 pm on March 4. Repair operations began immediately but were interrupted for over a week due to high winds. During the high winds event nearly all of the remaining panels in the deflated roof, 100 in all, were badly damaged. The decision was made to replace the entire roof and incorporate some improvements to prevent a similar event from occurring in the future. Repair cost of the roof was just under $8 million.

The repairs were completed and the dome re-inflated at noon on May 28, 1985. A thunderstorm passed through the Pontiac area the morning the Dome was to be re-inflated and a partial inflation, or "puff", was performed so that the scheduled inflation could occur in the presence of the many city and area politicians as well as a number of corporate executives. The original-style, Teflon-coated fiberglass material was used to make the repairs – not canvas as described in the article. There were several snow-melting and waterproofing improvements that kept the dome inflated until January 2, 2013 – almost 28 years.

Notable audience attendance numbers
The largest crowd to gather at the Silverdome was on September 18, 1987, for Mass with Pope John Paul II, with a reported attendance of 93,682 — just shading the reported record of 93,173 set at the Silverdome on March 29, 1987, for WrestleMania III. Another notable audience attendance record had earlier been broken on April 30, 1977, when the English rock band Led Zeppelin played in front of 76,229 fans at the Silverdome. This was, at the time, a new world record attendance for a solo indoor attraction, beating the 75,962 that The Who attracted there on December 6, 1975. The Detroit Pistons also set numerous NBA attendance records during their time at the Silverdome; Regular Season, 61,983 vs. Boston, January 29, 1988; Playoffs, 41,732, vs. L.A. Lakers, June 16, 1988.

1994 FIFA World Cup
The Silverdome was a venue for the 1994 FIFA World Cup. In an exhibition game between Germany and England in June 1993, English coach Graham Taylor criticized the indoor venue's lack of weather as removing an unpredictability factor from soccer. The lack of air conditioning contributed to extreme heat and humidity, an advantage to the Germans playing on Italian clubs. The 62,126 attendance was the highest in any US soccer match since 1984.

On June 18, 1994, the United States tied 1–1 with Switzerland in the first World Cup game to be played indoors. Swiss coach Roy Hodgson later admitted that his team had not prepared for the extreme temperature and humidity.

Marching band activities and events
The Silverdome was also the home to many marching band activities and events, including the Michigan Competing Band Association State Marching Band Championships until 2005, the Bands of America Regional championships from 2003 to 2005, and the Bands of America Grand National Championships in 1987 and 1988. Following its reopening, the Silverdome was host to the 2010, 2011 and 2012 Bands of America Pontiac Regional Championship.

Usage after Lions' move to Ford Field
The Lions moved from the Silverdome to Ford Field after the end of their 2001 season. Despite being the Lions' home for 27 seasons, the day of the last home game, January 6, 2002, was marked by a noticeable absence of nostalgia among the fans as well as the players. In particular, long-time Lions' defensive end Robert Porcher singled out the stadium's artificial turf as the worst part about playing at the Silverdome, echoing other players present that day.

The upper concourse was used for inline skating and provided skaters with a 25-foot wide track measuring 0.4 miles on the inner edge and 0.5 miles on the outer edge.

When the World Hockey Association (WHA) tried to re-introduce itself, the new WHA Detroit team was slated to play its home games at the Silverdome. Plans were also mooted for a Windsor-based Canadian Football League team which could have used the dome for possible playoff games, but that team also did not materialize.

After the Lions relocated, activity in the Silverdome dropped drastically; however, it still staged some events. Annually, Jehovah's Witnesses used the Silverdome from the late 1970s to 2004. Due to talk of renovation in 2004, the Witnesses opted to travel to The Dow Event Center in Saginaw, and the SeaGate Convention Centre in Toledo, Ohio for their District Conventions. Between 2003 and 2006, a three-screen drive-in theater operated in the parking lot; this theater reopened in 2010 before closing again on July 13, 2011.

The Silverdome hosted Monster Jam on January 7, 2006, and was used as a practice facility for the AFC champion Pittsburgh Steelers for Super Bowl XL, with the NFL adding FieldTurf, which was later donated to a local high school.

Sale
After the Lions' departure, the city of Pontiac began to experience several years of serious financial problems. Due to the continued high maintenance costs of the structure, it made several unsuccessful attempts to sell the stadium.  In early 2008, United Assurance Company Ltd. made the highest purchase offer to date, with a bid of $18 million to convert the Silverdome into a Hollywood-style entertainment complex, following an earlier bid of $12 million by an attorney.  However, the city announced in October 2009 that the property would go to auction with no minimum bid, and that zoning regulations would be relaxed for any buyer in order to spark development. The city engaged the firm of Williams & Williams to conduct the auction in November 2009.

After reading about the auction in a newspaper, Greek-born Canadian real estate developer Andreas Apostolopoulos, CEO of Toronto-based Triple Properties Inc., submitted a winning bid of US$550,000. Real estate fees of 6% raised the price to US$583,000. The sale of the Silverdome, completed in 1975 at a cost of $55.7 million (approx. $225 million in 2012 dollars) and sold in 2009 for $583,000, was viewed by many as a symbol of the collapse of real estate prices in the Detroit metropolitan area though many local leaders and residents claimed the sale was brought about due to the incompetence of city management and their not having a vision or future plans for the stadium and surrounding area.

Reopening (2010–2013)
In the March 11, 2010, edition of the Detroit Free Press, Apostolopoulos vowed "to revive the stadium as a big-event venue by investing millions of dollars".

The Silverdome re-opened on April 17, 2010, with a monster truck event.

A.C. Milan and Panathinaikos F.C. played an exhibition game on August 6, 2010. On January 29, 2011, professional boxer Timothy Bradley defended his WBO light welterweight title in a unification fight against WBC champion Devon Alexander. The fight aired live on HBO World Championship Boxing, with an attendance of about 7,000.

The owners indicated that they were pursuing a possible expansion team for Major League Soccer, and contemplated renovating the Silverdome for this purpose. Ultimately, the lack of events coming into the stadium, combined with the 2013 roof collapse, put any further development plans on indefinite hold.

Auctioning of contents and demolition
In March 2014, the owners announced that they would be auctioning off the contents of the facility, including seats and fixtures.

In December 2014, Cleveland-based photographer Johnny Joo captured the Silverdome in a state of abandonment, showing destruction caused by the 2013 roof collapse.

Afterwards, in October 2015, it was announced that the Silverdome would be demolished in the Spring of 2016, and the area would be part of an Oakland County mixed-use development. Demolition was then scheduled for December 3, 2017. In June 2016, fire caused by arson destroyed the former press box. Around the same time, the parking lot began being used as storage for hundreds of VW diesel cars as a result of Volkswagen's 2015 emissions scandal. The dome owner and the city were in conflict over the condition of the dome and the cars in the lot.

In 2017, the Silverdome was condemned and cleared for demolition. Workers had been on the site for the past few months before main power feeds were disconnected preparing the Silverdome for demolition, including completing environmental remediation, universal waste removal and tearing out transite asbestos panels that were used in a majority of the suites around the perimeter of the dome; though not without a few local trespasser visits to explore the place leading up to the demolition. On September 18 and 19, 2017, four power feeds were disconnected, officially starting the final preparation process for demolition. The firm contracted to handle the demolition, the Detroit-based Adamo Group, also imploded the Georgia Dome in Atlanta on November 20 before moving on to the Silverdome. The demolition of the Silverdome was to commence on December 3, 2017, with a partial implosion of the upper deck, followed by an excavation of the building from the inside out.

Due to a wiring issue, eight of the explosive charges failed to detonate, preventing the stadium from imploding as planned. A second attempt was successful the next day. While Adamo could not pinpoint the exact cause of the issues, they did note that trespassers had been seen on the property a couple of days prior to the first attempt.
Demolition officials stated that final filling and grading operations of the former Silverdome site were expected to be completed by the end of November 2018.

Site re-development
In September 2019, the City of Pontiac announced that Amazon was going to develop the Silverdome site into both a distribution facility and delivery center. The delivery center opened in September 2020, while the distribution center opened in 2021. The project cost an estimated at $250 million.

Significant events

NFL
August 23, 1975 – Detroit Lions' first game in Silverdome, a preseason contest against the Kansas City Chiefs.
October 6, 1975 – Lions first regular season game, a 36–10 defeat by the Dallas Cowboys on ABC Monday Night Football.
October 12, 1975 – Lions first regular season Silverdome victory, a 27–7 defeat of the Chicago Bears.
November 27, 1975 – Lions first Thanksgiving Day game in the Silverdome, a 20–0 loss to the Los Angeles Rams.
January 24, 1982 – Super Bowl XVI.
January 5, 1992 – Lions first home playoff game at the Silverdome – a 38–6 victory over the Dallas Cowboys, which remains their last playoff win as of 2022.
 November 23, 2000 – Tom Brady made his NFL debut in a 34–9 Lions victory at the Silverdome. Brady completed 1 of 3 passes for 6 yards.
 January 6, 2002 – Final Detroit Lions game played, a 15–10 victory over the Dallas Cowboys.

Basketball
October 13, 1978 – Detroit Pistons' first home game in Silverdome
February 4, 1979 – NBA All-Star Game
January 29, 1988 – Detroit Pistons single game attendance record (61,983 vs Boston Celtics)
1988 – NCAA Division I men's basketball tournament Midwest Regional – Sweet Sixteen Games and Finals
June 12, 14 and 16, 1988 – NBA Finals games 3 through 5.
1991 – NCAA Division I men's basketball tournament Midwest Regional – Sweet Sixteen Games and Finals

Soccer

Boxing & Pro Wrestling
March 29, 1987 – WrestleMania III (reported Pontiac Silverdome record attendance of 93,173).
January 29, 2011 – (HBO Championship Boxing Match) "The Superfight".

Concerts

Other events
February 27, 1983 — The American Speed Association (ASA) held an asphalt stock car race inside the dome. The ASA started their National tour's season in the dome and the race was won by Butch Miller.
September 18, 1987 — Pope John Paul II celebrated Mass (Silverdome attendance record of 93,682).
October 27, 2004 Rally for the George W. Bush 2004 relection campaign
 April 17, 2010 — "Domination In The Dome" (Monster Trucks) Grand re-opening of the Silverdome.

In popular culture
November 25, 1997: In the season 7 Home Improvement episode Thanksgiving, Tim (Tim Allen) manages to black out the entire stadium during the Detroit Lions' annual Thanksgiving Day game.
January 27, 2016: The Silverdome's inception and demise, including Super Bowl XVI, are profiled by Sports Illustrateds MMQB, "Road to Super Bowl 50".
Throughout his career, wrestling legend Hulk Hogan made various references to being the first man to body-slam Andre the Giant at WrestleMania III—The Birth of a Dynasty and the Death of a Dome.
 The Silverdome appears in Transformers: The Last Knight, the fifth installment in the Paramount film franchise. Crews began filming on June 20, 2016, and shot in the area for about eight weeks. The movie was released in theaters on June 23, 2017.

Notes

References

External links

Demolition video

Covered stadiums in the United States
Defunct National Football League venues
Defunct indoor soccer venues in the United States
Defunct soccer venues in the United States
Detroit Lions stadiums
Detroit Pistons venues
Detroit Express
1994 FIFA World Cup stadiums
Defunct NCAA bowl game venues
Former National Basketball Association venues
American football venues in Michigan
United States Football League venues
Defunct college football venues
Sports in Pontiac, Michigan
Sports venues in Oakland County, Michigan
Indoor soccer venues in Michigan
Indoor track and field venues in Michigan
Air-supported structures
North American Soccer League (1968–1984) indoor venues
North American Soccer League (1968–1984) stadiums
Michigan Panthers stadiums
1975 establishments in Michigan
Sports venues completed in 1975
2013 disestablishments in Michigan
Sports venues demolished in 2018
Demolished sports venues in Michigan
Buildings and structures demolished by controlled implosion